Scotinosphaera paradoxa is a species of alga belonging to the family Scotinosphaeraceae.

Synonym:
 Kentrosphaera facciolaae Borzì, 1883

References

Ulvophyceae